Stephen Morris is an Eastern Orthodox minister and author.

Works

References

Living people
Eastern Orthodox writers
21st-century Eastern Orthodox priests
Year of birth missing (living people)